Isonga FC is a Rwandan football club, based in Kigali.

The club was founded in 2011.

In June 2013, the club released their entire playing staff after being relegated from the Primus National Football League.

Players
see

References

Sport in Kigali
Football clubs in Rwanda
Association football clubs established in 2011
2011 establishments in Rwanda